Graphic Sexual Horror is a 2009 independent film written and directed by Anna Lorentzon and Barbara Bell in their directorial debut. The film is a documentary about Insex, a bondage website.

Graphic Sexual Horror premiered to critic and audience acclaim  at Slamdance Film Festival in January 2009 and has been selected by IMDb's Arno Kazarian as the only Slamdance 2009 film reviewed in the Sundance festival's selection.

The film won Best Documentary at the 2009 CineKink Film Festival, Official Selection at the 2009 Calgary Underground Film Festival, Official Selection at the HotDocs Film Festival, Official Selection at the 2009 Buenos Aires Film Festival, Official Selection at the 2009 Fantasia International Film Festival in Montreal and Official Selection at the 2009 Athens International Film Festival in Greece.

Synapse Films announced the August 2010 release of the Special Edition DVD of Graphic Sexual Horror on June 30, 2010.

See also
 Kink (film)

References

External links
  (link broken)
 

2009 films
American documentary films
Documentary films about business
Documentary films about American pornography
Films set in New York City
2009 directorial debut films
2000s English-language films
2000s American films